Ján Krošlák was the defending champion but did not compete that year.

Javier Sánchez won in the final 6–4, 7–5 against Marcos Ondruska.

Seeds

Draw

Finals

Top half

Bottom half

References
 1996 Eisenberg Israel Open Draw

Tel Aviv Open
1996 ATP Tour